The 2013–14 season is the twelfth season in FC Vaslui's existence, and its ninth in a row in the top flight of Romanian football. Vaslui will seek to win their first trophy, competing in the Liga I and the Romanian Cup.

First-team squad

Transfers

Summer

Transfers in

Transfers out

Loans out

Statistics

Appearances and goals
Last updated on 11 May 2014.

|-
|colspan="12"|Players sold or loaned out during the season
|-

|-
|colspan="12"|Statistics of the FC Vaslui players playing for another team
|-

|}

Top scorers

Top Assisters

Disciplinary record

Overall

{|class="wikitable"
|-
|Games played || 8 (7 Liga I, 1 Romanian Cup)
|-
|Games won || 4 (3 Liga I, 1 Romanian Cup)
|-
|Games drawn || 2 (2 Liga I)
|-
|Games lost || 2 (2 Liga I)
|-
|Goals scored || 9
|-
|Goals conceded || 5
|-
|Goal difference || +4
|-
|Yellow cards || 15
|-
|Red cards || 3
|-
|Worst discipline ||Lucian Sânmărtean with 4 
|-
|Best result || 4–0 (H) v CFR Cluj – Liga I – 5 Aug 2013
|-
|Worst result || 0–2 (A) v Dinamo București – Liga I – 28 Jul 2013
|-
|Most appearances || 6 players with 7 appearances
|-
|Top scorer || Piotr Celeban and Liviu Antal with 3 goals
|-
|Points || 11/21 (52.38%)
|-

Performances
Updated to games played on 24 September 2013.

Goal minutes
Updated to games played on 24 September 2013.

Liga I

League table

Results summary

Results by round

Matches

Liga I

Cupa României

References 

FC Vaslui seasons
Vaslui